The Mindanao Railway, previously known as the Trans-Mindanao High Speed Railway, is a proposed inter-city rail system in Mindanao, the southernmost major island of the Philippines. Originally proposed in 1936 as part of Manuel L. Quezon's efforts to strengthen the presence of Commonwealth government in Mindanao against the rising influence of Imperial Japan before World War II, the line was shelved. Other proposals and studies were made in the 1950s, 1990s, and the 2000s, but never materialized. The current line began development in 2018, with construction set to begin in late 2021. It will be initially built as a single-track standard gauge system to be operated by diesel-powered rolling stock, but will have provisions for upgrading to double-track and electrification through overhead lines.

An east-west radial mainline shall also be built to the Zamboanga Peninsula, and a number of other radial lines will serve as branch lines. As with other projects of the Philippine National Railways, the Mindanao Railway shall be constructed in phases covering segments of various lengths. The first phase, the Tagum–Digos segment of the circumferential mainline, will be the first section to be constructed. This segment will be partially opened by 2022, with full operations by 2024. The rest of the 17 segments will be built as part of Phases 2 to 10, with a target completion date between 2032 and 2037.

History

Historical railways 

The first attempt to construct a rail line in Mindanao was made in the 1890s, when the Spanish colonial government attempted to build a Decauville railway between Iligan and Marawi. However, this was never finished.

Not long later, a series of narrow-gauge railroads were opened by the American government in Mindanao. These short lines were constructed to transport supplies and United States Army personnel. A line was opened in Camp Keithley in what is now Marawi where trains carry war materiel on flatcars. A  gauge short line was also opened in Jolo, Sulu.

The best-documented system built by the government was the single-track line of the Davao Penal Colony in Davao del Norte. The prison was established in 1932 by the American government. It was converted into a facility for American POWs after its occupation by Imperial Japanese Army forces in 1942. Davao Penal Colony survivor Raymond C. Heimbuch wrote in his book that the line suffered from poor condition of the rolling stock and lack of maintenance of the tracks. There was a sole diesel locomotive and 40 flatcars, having replaced a steam locomotive which its tender survived after the war. The locomotive would pair with 5 or 6 flatcars that carry prisoners, sacks of rice, or forestry products. The train would take a 45-minute trip per way. He also commented that prisoners were forced to push the train in case of rain or when ascending steep grades due to the poor conditions of the tracks. A few years after the war, a two-car train welcomed the party of then-president Elpidio Quirino during his visit to the area.

At the same time, local plantations and lumber mills also built their own systems during the 1920s and the 1930s, typically serving freight trains from the production facilities to a port. At Port Lamon, Surigao del Norte, trains carry timber from the jungle and sawmill to the pier. One Class B Shay locomotive was used by the Kolambugan Lumber and Development Company of Lanao del Norte during the 1920s and the 1930s. In Malabang, Lanao del Sur, a local company also ran freight trains through the town during the 1930s. In Misamis Oriental, the Anakan Lumber Company also operated Heisler locomotives in the town of Gingoog during the 1920s and 1930s.

These short lines were either destroyed by World War II or dismantled in the case of the Davao Penal Colony line. Sometime after President Quirino's visit, the line was dismantled due to its condition. The metal used was then sold to the Chinese black market due to the high market value of iron there. Despite closures of local freight railroads due to the rise of truck traffic, one line was established in the Davao Region by the Tagum Agricultural Development Company (TADECO). It started operations in 1950, and had 2 diesel locomotives that hauled abaca and Cavendish banana produce. The locomotives were decommissioned and stored in 2010.

Initial proposals

Proposals for the Mindanao Railway have been published by the Daily Bulletin and The Far Eastern Review as early as August 1906. These proposed corridors include those surrounding Cotabato, Davao City, Lake Lanao and Sulu. There were no proposed interconnections between these four lines due to the technology and rather low population density of the region during that time.

Then-president Manuel L. Quezon proposed the construction of an electrified railroad between Cagayan de Oro (then known as Misamis) and Davao City passing through the province of Bukidnon. It would have been electrified by overhead lines powered by the Maria Cristina Falls' hydroelectric power plant (now the Agus VI Hydroeletric Plant). This proposal was made in January 1936, and was taken note by Quezon's adviser Francis Burton Harrison. Some track bed construction began the same year but the project was left incomplete without a single track placed when construction was halted in 1940.

After the war, Manila Railroad General Manager and later Senator Prospero Sanidad proposed a standard-gauge railway in 1952 with consideration for a future electrified network.

The following lines were proposed, each at least 100 kilometers (62 miles) long:
The route will also pass by Malaybalay.
A branch line would have passed by Parang, Maguindanao.
A branch line would have passed by Butuan.
A station would have also been built in the area of Dansalan.
The area referred in this study as Makar is now divided between General Santos and T'Boli, South Cotabato.

According to this older plan, Kibawe (then known as Kibawa) and Davao City are the main hubs for the network. Although never realized, it left an influence to the right-of-way of the present Mindanao Railway proposal, particularly on the circumferential main line.

Mindanao and the Philippine National Railway 
When the Philippine National Railway (PNR) was created by virtue of Republic Act 4156 in 1964, establishment of a railway in Mindanao was made part of its mandate. Section 5 of the law explicitly stated that P50M had been allocated for the survey and establishment of a railway on the island. When RA 4156 was superseded by Republic Act 6366 in 1971, the same explicit mandate to create a Mindanao Railway, under the PNR, remained.

However, when the law enabling the PNR was amended by Presidential Decree 741 in July 1975, reference to a railway in Mindanao was omitted.

Return of the Mindanao Railway to the national agenda 
On December 15, 1992, Fidel Ramos signed Memorandum Circular No.23 which directed the formulation of the Medium-Term Philippine Dev't Plan 1993–1998. Secion 4.4.2 of this plan focused on Transportation. Sub-paragraph "M" called for a feasibility study for the Mindanao Railway under a Build Operate Transfer (BOT) arrangement.

From the Mindanao Railway System Task Force to the Mindanao Railway Project Office 
President Joseph Estrada created the Presidential Committee on Flagship Programs and Projects to identify projects for the administration. On October 7, 1998, the committee directed the Philippine National Railways, Public Estates Authority, and the Southern Philippine Development Authority to conduct preparatory studies for the Mindanao Railway System.

On June 28, 1999, Estrada signed Administrative Order 74, series of 1999 which allocated P10M to the Mindanao Rail System Task Force to, as stated in the order to:

. . . act as the clearing house for policy and operational issues affecting the implementation of the MRS Project

However, on February 11, 2002—after Estrada's impeachment the year before—President Gloria Macapagal-Arroyo signed Executive Order 72, series 2002 which abolished the MRS Task Force. Later, however, Arroyo replaced the task force with another organization.

On May 25, 2006, President Gloria Macapagal-Arroyo signed Executive Order 536 which created the Cebu Railway Project Office (CRPO) and the Mindanao Railway Project Office (MRPO) under the control of the Department of Transportation and Communication (DOTC). Both were charged formulating plans for, identifying funding mechanisms for, and developing, railways in Metro Cebu and Mindanao respectively.

Mindanao Strategic Railway Development Plan
The government made numerous studies and technical assessments during the 1990s. In the early 2000s, the Mindanao Strategic Railway Development Plan was formulated. The plan for a railway divided into four phases: Laguindingan to Cagayan de Oro, Laguindingan to Iligan, Cagayan de Oro to Tagoloan, Misamis Oriental and Iligan to Linamon, Lanao del Norte. The network would have linked urban centers across the island and was aimed to cut the 90-minute travel time by bus between Cagayan de Oro and Iligan to 15–20 minutes. The project was slated to start construction in 2011, and Saudi Arabia expressed interest in funding the project. The project was later discontinued.

2010s 
As part of the updated 2011–2016 Philippine Development Plan, ₱400 million (US$8.85 million) was allotted for conducting feasibility studies to develop infrastructure projects such as railways and roads. In 2014, there were debates whether the system shall be privately managed or run by the Philippine National Railways which at this point, intermittently operated inter-city rail services in Luzon.

The Japan International Cooperation Agency (JICA) and the National Economic and Development Authority conducted studies for the construction of a rail system in the island of Mindanao along with its partners starting in 2015. The proposal in 2015 resembled the 1952 right-of-way. The government planned to build the railway in six phases, with the first running from Iligan to Gingoog. A pre-proposal conference was conducted in 2015, but the railway was not included in the Public-Private Partnership program.

Development 
The railway in its present form began development in the late 2010s. While JICA was conducting initial studies, then-presidential candidate and later president Rodrigo Duterte supported the construction of the railway. Upon his election, he aimed to begin construction of the first phase between the cities of Tagum and Digos by 2017 and open it partially before his term ends by 2022. In 2018, the project, initially called the Trans-Mindanao High Speed Railway, was approved and received initial funding from Congress. However, construction was delayed after several eminent domain issues, specifically after residents of a high-end gated community near Davao City has requested the Department of Transportation to realign the railway line to avoid hitting an 18-hole golf course.

The railway's route was modified into a system that centers on a circular mainline. However, it was later reverted into the old right of way, but now incorporating the extensions and branch lines featured in the 2019 proposal. In its current state, the project has 18 segments to be divided into 10 phases.

On March 24, 2021, DOTr Undersecretary for Project Implementation in Mindanao Eymard Eje, Tagum mayor Allan Rellon and Carmen mayor Virginia Perandos signed a deed of absolute sale for land to be used to be used for the construction of the Tagumpay Train Village, a resettlement area for families affected by the project. As of April 2021, land acquisition from Panabo to Carmen is almost complete. On April 19, 2021, the city government of Panabo issued an ordinance prohibiting any unrelated construction on the right-of-way of the Mindanao Railway.

The Project Management Consultant Contract for the Tagum-Davao-Digos Segment of the project was signed on October 20, 2021.

Construction
Construction is yet to begin on the first phase of the Mindanao Railway. In a 2020 interview with Department of Transportation (DOTr) Undersecretary for Railways Timothy John Batan, the system was originally set to begin construction in the third quarter of 2021, with partial operations by 2022. The rest of the system will be opened between 2032 and 2037.

The start of construction was delayed in May 2022 as the DOTr did not receive the shortlist of the design-and-build contractors from the Chinese government.

However, in July 2022, the project funding was withdrawn after the Chinese government failed to act on the funding requests by the Duterte administration including the Subic–Clark railway and PNR South Long Haul projects. A month later, on August 11, Chinese Ambassador to the Philippines Huang Xilian and Transport Secretary Jaime Bautista held formal talks ending in an agreement to restart negotiations for the three railway projects.

On September 30, 2022, the DOTr said that the project could be finished by 2028 if the loan for the project is finalized by 2023.

Route 

Phase 1 will be partially opened between Panabo and Carmen, Davao del Norte by 2022, and full operations are expected by 2024.

Phase 1 
Also known as the Tagum–Davao–Digos (TDD) segment, this involves the construction of a  segment between the cities of Tagum and Digos, passing through Davao City. It will have eight stations alongside two depots to be located in Tagum and Davao City, with the former being the segment's main yard. This is the only segment confirmed to have planned double-tracking and electrification upgrades in the future.

Other proposed phases 
Phase 2 — The second phase will involve a  segment south of Phase 1 between the cities of Digos and Koronadal, passing through General Santos. 

Phase 3 — The Third phase is envisioned to have an estimated length of 54.8 kilometers connecting the metropolitan area of Cagayan De Oro from Laguindingan to Villanueva. It was identified in the 2021 Master Plan for the Sustainable Urban Infrastructure Development in Metropolitan Cagayan de Oro and will be an important transportation mode as Cagayan de Oro develops as the fourth metro area according to the National Spatial Strategy. 

Phase 5 — The fifth phase will involve a  segment north of Phase 1 between the cities of Tagum and Butuan.

Phase 5 — Phases 4 and 5 are the last two projects in sealing the new circumferential mainline of the Mindanao Railway, which replaced the Cagayan de Oro–Pagadian–Digos segment.
Koronadal–Cagayan de Oro segment and Davao City–Bukidnon branch — The length of this combined main line segment and branch system is yet to be determined. The Davao City–Bukidnon branch will meet with the other end of the main line of the Koronadal–Cagayan de Oro segment at Talakag, Bukidnon according to the Department of Transportation. This right-of-way is different to the earlier proposals that would have passed by the area of Valencia and Malaybalay.
A branch line will be constructed from Butuan and will head north to Surigao City.
Phases 6 to 10 — Phases 6 to 10 involves the construction of four radial lines with one having an extension into the mainline network.  will be the main hub of four of these segments and lines. The following branch lines are involved:
Cagayan de Oro–Pagadian segment — This will be a  segment between Cagayan de Oro and Pagadian via Iligan.
Pagadian–Digos segment — This will be a  segment between Pagadian and Digos, the latter being the southern terminus of Phase 1. It will also pass through Cotabato City and traverse the circumferential mainline via Kabacan.
Pagadian–Dipolog branch — This will be a  line between Pagadian and Dipolog.
Pagadian–Zamboanga segment — This will be a  line between Pagadian and Zamboanga City.
Butuan–Surigao branch — This will be a  line between Butuan and Surigao City.

Design
The Mindanao Railway will be initially constructed as a single-track line with future upgrades to dual tracking and rail electrification. The right-of-way acquired for the alignment is sufficient for a dual-track system, thus facilitating the upgrade. Timothy John Batan, Department of Transportation Undersecretary for Railways, has said he wanted these upgrades to be implemented at once. This is part of the larger efforts by the agency to convert its network from narrow to standard gauge, the first in Southeast Asia to do so. Commuter trains will also have a headway of 13 minutes during partial operations for Phase 1. Lastly, the project suggests the use of the European Train Control System for its signalling and train control systems with at least Level 1 to be installed on the line.

A section of Phase 1 in Davao City shall also be connected to the Davao People Mover by a connecting bus service.

Electrification and double-tracking
The line shall be initially constructed as a single-track line that will be by operated with diesel rolling stock, although upgrades to a standard electrified double-track mainline will be constructed in the future. The specific type of electrification system that will be adopted on the Mindanao Railway is yet to be determined. On the other hand, expansion of the single-track line to double-track has already been considered for at least the Tagum–Davao–Digos section, which is included in the total of  track length of the entire system. For the current station arrangement however, passing sidings shall be used to allow trains to stop without obstructing traffic from the opposite direction especially with the target headway being 13 minutes.

The 2016 JICA study suggests the use of overhead catenaries on or before 2045.

High-speed rail

In 2018, the project was initially given the marketing title of the Trans-Mindanao High-Speed Railway. This was later simplified to Mindanao Railway after a maximum speed of  has been determined which is less than half of true high-speed rail. The name change also happened with the North–South Commuter Railway in Luzon and the Tel Aviv–Jerusalem railway in Israel, both of which were marketed as "high-speed" to distinguish themselves from the much slower existing train services there.

Despite the change in the project title, there are plans for a genuine high-speed rail network in the region, and the proposed infrastructure of the Mindanao Railway was planned with future high-speed rail development in mind along as with all the proposed railways for PNR. The two shortlisted Chinese proponents also stated interest in designing a high-speed line that will be capable of running speeds of up to  once the present project achieves successful operations.

Rolling stock
The system is made to accommodate both passenger and freight rolling stock, the latter due to its dual-purpose to connect seaports around the island. Only the specifications for the commuter trains for the Tagum–Digos section was given as of December 2020. The diesel multiple units that will be used in the commuter service are arranged in married pairs, and will be combined in the future for arrangement of four- and eight-car unit trainsets.

An earlier order also cited the purchase of rolling stock for the intercity section. This order includes 33 DMU cars for the passenger service which include six 5-car units and three spare cars for passenger trains, and 4 diesel-electric locomotives with 15 freight cars. The whereabouts of this order is yet to be determined.

Notes

References

Rail transportation in the Philippines by city
Proposed rail infrastructure in Asia
Rail infrastructure in the Philippines
Mindanao